Gorka is a rural locality (a village) in Mayskoye Rural Settlement, Vologodsky District, Vologda Oblast, Russia. The population was 26 as of 2002.

Geography 
The distance to Vologda is 28 km, to Maysky is 13 km. Semenkovo, Tretnikovo, Derevenka are the nearest  localities, creek Mesha

References 

Rural localities in Vologodsky District